Come In is the fourth and final studio album by Children 18:3, released on April 21, 2015 on Tooth & Nail Records. The album was funded via a Kickstarter project.

Critical reception

Awarding the album four and a half stars at HM Magazine, Ben Rickaby stated, "Come In is an inspiringly appropriate sendoff". In five four star reviews by Jesus Freak Hideout, Roger Gelwicks wrote, "Come In is a more than fitting finale for this exceptional trio"; Nathaniel Schexnayder wrote, "The one sure thing is this: the trio brings one last, strong punk-inspired rock project into an underserved genre in Christian music", and Scott Fryberger wrote, "The crowd-funded Come In is a strong effort, and it's everything you'd expect from the band: a lot of energy and passion, with some anti-formulaic approaches to punk rock." Kevin Davis described it in a four and a half star review from New Release Tuesday, as a "most meaningful" album because the music has "emotive vocals and harmonies layered over one catchy and meaningful song after another" where "Children 18:3 saved their best for last."

Track listing

References

2015 albums
Tooth & Nail Records albums
Children 18:3 albums
Kickstarter-funded albums